girl friends – Freundschaft mit Herz is a German television series.

See also
List of German television series

External links
 

1995 German television series debuts
2007 German television series endings
German-language television shows
ZDF original programming